Our Children is a 2012 Belgian-French psychological drama film directed by Joachim Lafosse. It is based on a real-life incident involving a woman (Geneviève Lhermitte) who killed her five children. The film competed in the Un Certain Regard section at the 2012 Cannes Film Festival under the title Loving Without Reason, where Émilie Dequenne won the Un Certain Regard Award for Best Actress.

Cast
 Émilie Dequenne as Murielle
 Niels Arestrup as André Pinget
 Tahar Rahim as Mounir
 Stéphane Bissot as Françoise
 Mounia Raoui as Fatima
 Redouane Behache as Samir
 Baya Belal as Rachida
 Nathalie Boutefeu as Docteur Declerck
 Claire Bodson as Police Officer

Reception
Critical response was generally strong and the film was nominated for seven Magritte Awards, winning four, including Best Film and Best Director for Lafosse. The film was selected as the Belgian entry for the Best Foreign Language Oscar at the 85th Academy Awards, but it did not make the final shortlist.

The Hollywood Reporter wrote, "In one of her strongest leading roles to date, Dequenne (The Girl on the Train, Rosetta) does a remarkable job depicting Murielle’s wavering psychological states as she heads for oblivion, and an extended sequence-shot where she drives home while singing a Julien Clerc song is particularly unforgettable."

Accolades

See also
 List of submissions to the 85th Academy Awards for Best Foreign Language Film
 List of Belgian submissions for the Academy Award for Best Foreign Language Film

References

External links
 
 

2012 films
2010s French-language films
2010s psychological drama films
2010s Arabic-language films
Belgian crime drama films
Crime films based on actual events
Drama films based on actual events
French crime drama films
Filicide in fiction
Films about murderers
Films set in Belgium
Films set in Morocco
Films set in the 2000s
Films shot in Belgium
Films shot in Morocco
Films with screenplays by Thomas Bidegain
Films directed by Joachim Lafosse
Magritte Award winners
Mass murder in fiction
2012 multilingual films
Belgian multilingual films
French multilingual films
2010s French films